Greigia sylvicola is a plant species in the genus Greigia. This species is native to Panama and Costa Rica.

References

sylvicola
Flora of Costa Rica
Flora of Panama
Plants described in 1927